Mariosousa is a genus of 13 species of flowering plants in the family Fabaceae. It belongs to the mimosoid clade of the subfamily Caesalpinioideae. Members of this genus were formerly considered to belong to the genus Acacia. 

Restricted in range to Central America, Mexico, and the southwestern United States, members of the genus are trees or shrubs bearing alternate, bipinnately compound leaves—each with a swelling at the base of the petiole—and white- to cream- or yellow-colored flowers. The flowers are typically borne in elongated, bottle brush–like spikes. The fruits that later replace these flowers are markedly flattened pods.

Species
The genus Mariosousa comprises the following species:
 Mariosousa acatlensis (Benth.) Seigler & Ebinger—Acatlan acacia
 Mariosousa centralis (Britton & Rose) Seigler & Ebinger—Central American acacia
 Mariosousa compacta (Rose) Seigler & Ebinger
 Mariosousa coulteri (Benth.) Seigler & Ebinger—Coulter acacia
 Mariosousa dolichostachya (S.F. Blake) Seigler & Ebinger—longspike acacia
 Mariosousa durangensis (Britton & Rose) Seigler & Ebinger—Durango acacia
 Mariosousa heterophylla (Benth.) Seigler & Ebinger—palo blanco, Willard acacia
 Mariosousa mammifera (Schltdl.) Seigler & Ebinger
 Mariosousa millefolia (S. Watson) Seigler & Ebinger—Milfoil wattle, Santa Rita acacia
 Mariosousa russelliana (Britton & Rose) Seigler & Ebinger
 Mariosousa salazarii (Britton & Rose) Seigler & Ebinger
 Mariosousa sericea (Martens & Galeotii) Seigler & Ebinger
 Mariosousa usumacintensis (Lundell) Seigler & Ebinger
Mariosousa willardiana is considered a synonym of Mariosousa heterophylla.

References

 
Fabaceae genera